George Robert Nail (April 21, 1925 – May 25, 1995) was an American bridge player and a club owner and teacher in Houston, Texas.

Nail was born in Kansas City, Missouri, with the congenital bone disorder osteogenesis imperfecta. In the 1960s he moved to Houston, where he operated Nail's Bridge Center with his wife Betty until his death. He died of a heart attack on May 25, 1995, survived by his wife and a sister.

Nail won four American Contract Bridge League national championships and placed second eleven times. He represented the United States twice in the Bermuda Bowl, finishing second
in 1963. He was inducted into the ACBL Hall of Fame in 2001. The Nail Life Master Open Pairs event is named after him.

Nail and Robert Stucker invented the Big Diamond bidding system and presented it in the 1965 book Revolution in Bridge. A major departure from Standard American bidding concepts of the day, it featured a weak notrump, an unbalanced big 1 opening and a 1 opening that was forcing but not necessarily strong.

Publications

 Revolution in Bridge: Featuring the big diamond and the fantastic no trump, Nail and Robert Stucker (San Antonio: Naylor, 1965), 325 pp.; ASIN B0007IX8GI

Bridge accomplishments

Honors

 ACBL Hall of Fame, 2001

Wins

 North American Bridge Championships (5)
 von Zedtwitz Life Master Pairs (1) 1974 
 Nail Life Master Open Pairs (1) 1974 
 Vanderbilt (1) 1967 
 Marcus Cup (1) 1948 
 Spingold (1) 1953

Runners-up

 North American Bridge Championships
 von Zedtwitz Life Master Pairs (1) 1979 
 Silodor Open Pairs (1) 1970 
 Wernher Open Pairs (1) 1949 
 Blue Ribbon Pairs (1) 1980 
 North American Pairs (1) 1989 
 Jacoby Open Swiss Teams (1) 1988 
 Vanderbilt (1) 1985 
 Mitchell Board-a-Match Teams (2) 1961, 1964 
 Reisinger (1) 1960 
 Spingold (1) 1962

References

External links
 
 

1925 births
1995 deaths
American contract bridge players
Bermuda Bowl players
Contract bridge writers
People from Kansas City, Missouri
People from Houston
People with osteogenesis imperfecta